Peak inspiratory pressure (PIP) is the highest level of pressure applied to the lungs during inhalation.  In mechanical ventilation the number reflects a positive pressure in centimeters of water pressure (cm H2O).  In normal breathing, it may sometimes be referred to as the maximal inspiratory pressure (MIPO), which is a negative value.

Peak inspiratory pressure increases with any airway resistance. Factors that may increase PIP include increased secretions, bronchospasm, biting down on ventilation tubing, and decreased lung compliance. PIP should never be chronically higher than 40 cm H2O unless the patient has acute respiratory distress syndrome.

See also
Static compliance
Dynamic compliance

References

Pulmonology
Respiratory therapy
Mechanical ventilation